Laos participated in the 16th Asian Games in Guangzhou from 12 November to 27 November 2010.

Medalists

References

Lao elites sport document

Nations at the 2010 Asian Games
2010
Asian Games